Leucodelphinidin is a colorless chemical compound related to leucoanthocyanidins. It can be found in Acacia auriculiformis, in the bark of Karada (Cleistanthus collinus) and in the kino (gum) from Eucalyptus pilularis. 

Other species containing leucodelphinidin include Aesculus hippocastanum (Horse chestnut, in rind/bark/cortex), Arachis hypogaea (Earth nut in seeds), Arbutus unedo (Arbutus, in the leaf), Caesalpinia pulcherrima (Barbados pride), Ceratonia siliqua (Carob, in the fruit), Hamamelis virginiana (American witch hazel, in the leaf), Hippophae rhamnoides (Hippophae berry, in the leaf), Humulus lupulus (bine flower / blossom, in the leaf), Musa acuminata × balbisiana (Banana, in the fruit), Nelumbo nucifera (lotus, in the leaf), Phyllanthus emblica (Emblic, Indian gooseberry, in the rind/bark/cortex), Quercus alba (White oak, in the rind/bark/cortex), Quercus robur (Common oak, in the rind/bark/cortex), Rumex hymenosepalus (Arizona dock, in the root), Schinus molle (California peppertree, in the leaf) and Vicia faba (bell-bean, in the seed).

A leucodelphinidin derivative isolated from Ficus bengalensis shows hypoglycemic effects.

Metabolism 
Dihydroflavonol 4-reductase (DFR) uses dihydromyricetin (ampelopsin) NADPH and 2 H+ to produce leucodelphinidin and NADP.

References 

Leucoanthocyanidins
Resorcinols
Pyrogallols